Kayagar (Kajagar, Kaygi, Kaygir, Wiyagar) is a Papuan language of Papua, Indonesia.

Further reading
Kriens, Ron, Randy Lebold and Jacqualine Menanti. 2011. Report on the Haju Subdistrict Survey in Papua, Indonesia. SIL International.
Krosschell, J. M. 1961. Samenvattend rapport over de detacheringsperiode aan de Casuarinenkust (Afdeling zuid-Nieuw-Guinea) [Summary report of the period of duty on the Casuarina Coast (South New Guinea Division)]. Nationaal Archief, Den Haag, Ministerie van Koloniën: Kantoor Bevolkingszaken Nieuw-Guinea te Hollandia: Rapportenarchief, 1950–1962, nummer toegang 2.10.25, inventarisnummer 438.

References

Languages of western New Guinea
Kayagar languages